Shaker Museum may refer to a museum about Shakers in the United States:

 Shaker Museum  Mount Lebanon, in New Lebanon, New York
 Enfield Shaker Museum, in Enfield, New Hampshire
 Shaker Museum at South Union, in Auburn, Kentucky
 Shaker Historical Museum, in Shaker Heights, Ohio

See also
 Fruitlands Museum, a Shaker museum in Harvard, Massachusetts

Shaker Museum